Chah Badam (also Romanized as Chāh Bādām) is a village in Golestan Rural District, in the Central District of Sirjan County, Kerman Province, Iran. At the 2006 census, its population was 89, in 22 families.

References 

Populated places in Sirjan County